Joseph Janse (August 19, 1909 in Middelburg, Netherlands – December 18, 1985), was the third child of Jan Pieter and Gertrude (De Voogd) Janse. Arriving in the US at age six, he attended the Weber County, Utah public schools, and he received two years of Pre-medical education at Weber State College by 1930. After three years  in Europe as a missionary, he transferred to University of Utah  to complete his pre-medical studies. He entered National College of Chiropractic in the spring of 1935 and  received both the DC and ND degrees  on June 17, 1938. On June 24, 1938, he married Gloria Julie Schade  in Utah and they had three children.

Biography
Upon graduation from National College, he immediately joined their faculty, and taught in the departments of Anatomy and Chiropractic, continuing through his tenure as President.
He was named one of four Deans,  and then in December, 1944, he was elected to the College's Board of Trustees. And in their Minutes of that meeting, he was elected President of National College.

Dr. Janse was licensed to practice in eleven states, and qualified by the Canadian board as well.

1947 - He spearheaded the formation of the Council on Chiropractic Education – USA, and served as its Secretary from 1947–1959, and President from 1951–1961 and foreign liaison until 1982, the Board took the unprecedented step of naming him "President Emeritus".
1967 - He was honored to have been selected to deliver  a paper called "The Scientific Basis of Chiropractic" before the U.S. Congressional Ad Hoc Committee on Chiropractic.
1971 - His contributions to the science of Chiropractic were so great, that the International College of Chiropractors elected him to the rank of "Dean" of the "Faculty" of the (Honorary) College; a post he held until his death in 1985.

References

1909 births
1985 deaths
American chiropractors
Heads of universities and colleges in the United States
Dutch emigrants to the United States
People from Illinois
People from Middelburg, Zeeland
National University of Health Sciences alumni
20th-century American academics